Nicollet Island/East Bank is a neighborhood in Minneapolis, Minnesota, situated just across the Mississippi River from Downtown, one of six in the University community. It comprises Nicollet Island and the portion of the eastern riverbank located between Central Avenue and the BNSF Railway line. The "East Bank" portion of the neighborhood is commonly referred to as a part of Northeast or Old St. Anthony, as this area was the location of the town of St. Anthony, which was annexed by Minneapolis in 1872.

East Hennepin Avenue runs through the middle of the neighborhood, which means it is situated in parts of both Northeast and Southeast Minneapolis. The neighborhood is bounded by Central Avenue, 2nd Avenue NE, and the river. Due to its proximity to Downtown, the area has seen a wave of gentrification in recent years; with shopping complexes and upscale condominiums built in the area.

References

External links
Minneapolis Neighborhood Profile - Nicollet Island/East Bank
Nicollet Island/East Bank Neighborhood Association

Neighborhoods in Minneapolis
Minnesota populated places on the Mississippi River